Conradia is a genus of very small sea snails or micromolluscs, marine gastropod molluscs in the family Conradiidae.

Species
Species within the genus Conradia include:
 Conradia abyssa Rubio & Rolán, 2017
 Conradia carinata Rubio & Rolán, 2020
 Conradia carinifera A. Adams, 1860
 Conradia cingulifera A. Adams, 1860
 Conradia clathrata A. Adams, 1860
 Conradia costriata Rubio & Rolán, 2020
 Conradia delicata Rubio & Rolán, 2020
 Conradia densa Rubio & Rolán, 2020
 Conradia depressa Rubio & Rolán, 2020
 Conradia discreta Rubio & Rolán, 2017
 Conradia dispersa Rubio & Rolán, 2020
 Conradia doliaris A. Adams, 1863
 Conradia edita Rubio & Rolán, 2020
 Conradia eutornisca (Melvill,  1918) (synonym: Fossarus  eutorniscus  Melvill, 1918) 
 Conradia faceta Rubio & Rolán, 2020
 Conradia microsculpta Rubio & Rolán, 2020
 Conradia minicostae Rubio & Rolán, 2020
 Conradia minor Rubio & Rolán, 2017
 Conradia multicostae Rubio & Rolán, 2020
 Conradia museorum Rubio & Rolán, 2020
 Conradia paucicordata Rubio & Rolán, 2020
 Conradia perclathrata Sakurai, 1983
 Conradia perplexa Rubio & Rolán, 2020
 Conradia pluriapices Rubio & Rolán, 2020
 Conradia pulchella A. Adams, 1861
 Conradia pyrgula A. Adams, 1863
 Conradia sculpta Rubio & Rolán, 2020
 Conradia similiter Rubio & Rolán, 2020
 Conradia sulcifera A. Adams, 1863
 Conradia sursumnodosa Rubio & Rolán, 2020
 Conradia tornata A. Adams, 1863
 Conradia varia Rubio & Rolán, 2020
Species brought into synonymy
 Conradia minuta Golikov & Starobogatov, 1976: synonym of Fusitriton oregonensis (Redfield, 1846)

References

 Adams A. (1860). On some new genera and species of Mollusca from Japan. Annals and Magazine of Natural History (3)5: 299-303; 405-413
 Higo, S., Callomon, P. & Goto, Y. (1999) Catalogue and Bibliography of the Marine Shell-Bearing Mollusca of Japan. Elle Scientific Publications, Yao, Japan, 749 pp.
New species of Crosseolidae Hickman, 2013 (Gastropoda) from the Tropical Indo-Pacific. Novapex 18(1-2): 17-34

External links
 To World Register of Marine Species
 Adams A. (1863). On the genera and species of Fossaridae found in Japan. Proceedings of the Zoological Society of London. (1863): 110-113

 
Conradiidae
Gastropod genera